Saint-Grégoire or variation, may refer:

People
Pope Gregory I, also known as Saint Gregory/Saint Grégoire
Nicolas Saint Grégoire (born 1983), American-French artist

Places

Canada
Saint-Grégoire, Quebec, a community of the city of Bécancour, Quebec
Mont Saint-Grégoire, mountain in the Montérégie region of southern Quebec
Mont-Saint-Grégoire, Quebec, Canada; a municipality
Saint-Grégoire-de-Greenlay, Quebec, Canada; a village municipality

France
A commune in France:
Saint-Grégoire, Ille-et-Vilaine, in the Ille-et-Vilaine department
Saint-Grégoire, Tarn, in the Tarn department
Saint-Grégoire-d'Ardennes, in the Charente-Maritime department
Saint-Grégoire-du-Vièvre, in the Eure department

See also
Knight of Saint-Grégoire
Gregoire (disambiguation)